The Lonely Tree (German: Der einsame Baum, sometimes translated as "The Solitary Tree") is an 1822 oil-on-canvas painting by German painter Caspar David Friedrich.  It measures .  The work depicts a panoramic view of a romantic landscape of plains with mountains in the background.  A solitary oak tree dominates the foreground.

An ancient oak stands at the centre of the painting, clearly damaged but still standing.  The tree's branches, dark in silhouette, project into the largely overcast morning sky.  Banks of cloud seem to form a dome above the tree.  The crown of the tree is dead, and the top of its trunk and two truncated branches resemble a cross.  A shepherd shelters under the leaf-bearing lower branches.  His flock of sheep graze beside a pond in the wide grassy meadow around the tree.  In the middle distance, villages and a town nestle among other trees and bushes.  Tree-clad hills pile up into blue-grey mountains in the background.

The work was commissioned by banker and art collector Joachim Heinrich Wilhelm Wagener, together with a second painting Moonrise by the Sea (Mondaufgang am Meer) to create a pair of "times of the day", depicting morning and evening landscape scenes, in a tradition of Claude Lorrain.  It was completed before November 1822 and has been held by the Berlin National Gallery since 1861, donated by Wagener as part of its founding collection.  It is now in the Alte Nationalgalerie of the Staatliche Museen in Berlin.

Art historian Helmut Börsch-Supan has suggested that the mountains are in the Riesengebirge, now in the Czech Republic, which historically divided Silesia and Bohemia, southeast of Dresden, where Friedrich settled in 1798.  Friedrich painted the mountains several times between 1806 and 1810.   The double peak may be Jeschken.

The painting has drawn a number of interpretations.  Ludwig Justi sees the old oak as a symbol of the German people, rooted in the landscape; Jens Christian Jensen sees it as a link between the past and the present; and Charlotte Margarethe de Prybram-Gladona sees it as a symbol of loneliness.

See also
List of works by Caspar David Friedrich

References
 Der einsame Baum, Staatliche Museen zu Berlin
 Caspar David Friedrich: Moonwatchers, p. 38-39
 Caspar David Friedrich, Solitary Tree (Village Landscape in Morning Light) (1822), German History in Documents and Images

External links

Paintings by Caspar David Friedrich
Landscape paintings
Paintings in the collection of the Alte Nationalgalerie
1822 paintings
Sheep in art
Water in art